Geografiska Annaler is a scientific journal published by the Swedish Society for Anthropology and Geography in Stockholm, Sweden. The journal is founded in 1919. Since 1965 the journal is published in two series A and B. Series A deals with arctic research, physical geography, glaciology and quaternary science in general. Series B covers the topics of human geography and economic geography, with a special, but not exclusive, focus on the Nordic and Baltic countries.

References

 

1919 establishments in Sweden
Geography journals
Geology journals
Glaciology journals
Quaternary science journals
Magazines published in Stockholm
Publications established in 1919
Quarterly journals